In the 19th century, Nicaragua was beset by political problems, allowing William Walker, an American Southerner seeking to establish English-speaking slavery states in Latin America, to ascend to the Nicaraguan presidency.

Walker believed in the doctrine of manifest destiny, and established himself in Nicaragua in the guise of offering help, but his real intentions were to conquer the five provinces of Central America, a manifesto he entitled, "Five or None."

In Costa Rica, Juan Rafael Mora Porras, the President, was urged by and backed by the British, saw the danger of Walker's intentions and on the 27 February 1856 declared war on Nicaragua and called all Costa Ricans to join forces and fight, a call that was heeded.

They began the march on the 4 March from San José to the northern border, led by the president, arriving in Liberia on the 12 March, where they joined the battalion organised there (Moracia Battalion), under the leadership of José María Cañas.

When the filibusters of the Nicaraguan movement realised what was happening in Costa Rica, they organised a battalion numbering about 70 men, two out of its four companies consisted entirely of Frenchmen the other two companies consisted entirely of Germans, under the leadership of Colonel Schlessinger, which entered Costa Rica through the road that joined Nicaragua with Liberia and which passed by the Hacienda Santa Rosa, where they arrived exhausted by the long and weary march on the 20 March late at night.

The Costa Ricans, meanwhile, began the walk to Santa Rosa and on the 20 March at 4 o'clock, armed with rifles, sabres, and bayonets, began the attack, surrounded the troublemakers who not having posted proper sentry were taken by surprise after having stationed themselves in the casona and in the corrals. Under the sudden attack the German company had broken and left the field, while the French under Capt. Legaye also retired from the broken ground they had attempted to occupy. In five minutes, the whole command was in disarray in full and disorderly retreat; in fourteen minutes the Costa Ricans had won the battle. Walker's troops suffered 59 killed and the Costa Ricans 20 killed.

The Santa Rosa's Casona, one of the few historical sites, was burned down in May 2001 and later re-built.

See also
 Second Battle of Rivas

References

Santa Rosa
Santa Rosa 1856
1856 in Costa Rica
1856 in Nicaragua
Santa Rosa